The tomb of the Etruscan king Lars Porsena is a legendary ancient building in what is now central Italy. Allegedly built around 500 BCE at Clusium (modern Chiusi, in south-eastern Tuscany), and was described as follows by the Roman writer Marcus Varro (116–27 BCE):

This structure, standing some 200 meters high, was supposedly destroyed along with Clusium itself in 89 BCE by the Roman general Cornelius Sulla. No trace of it has ever been found, and historians have generally regarded Varro’s account as a gross exaggeration at best, and downright fabrication at worst. 

In the 18th century Angelo Cortenovis proposed that the tomb of Lars Porsena was a machine for conducting lightning.

Gallery

References

External links
 The Etruscan Labyrinth
 Pliny book 36

Lars Porsena
Chiusi
5th-century BC architecture
5th century BC in Italy
1st-century BC disestablishments in the Roman Empire